EGMONT - The Royal Institute for International Relations, also known as the Egmont Institute, is an independent and non-profit Brussels-based think tank dedicated to interdisciplinary research on international relations. The main activities of the Egmont Institute include research, the organisation of events, and training for civil servants. The Institute is associated to the Foreign Ministry of Belgium, from which it receives a substantial part of its funding. The Egmont Institute furthermore receives funding from EU Institutions, membership fees and private partners.

History 
In 1947, the Royal Institute for International Relations (the Institute’s original name) was founded by a number of distinguished Belgian politicians. Among these Belgian figures were political leaders such as Paul van Zeeland, former Prime Minister; Prof. Charles de Visscher, member of the International Court of Justice; Prof. Fernand Dehousse, member of the Belgian delegation to the Conference of San Francisco; and Prof. Henri Rolin, Senator and Barrister-at-law. In 2006, in the run up to its sixtieth anniversary, the Institute changed its name to “EGMONT – The Royal Institute for International Relations” referring to the Egmont Palace, where many of its events are held.

List of Presidents

 Charles De Visscher 1947-1958
 Fernand Van Langenhove 1958-1966
 Baron Snoy et d'Oppuers 1966-1977
 Henri Simonet 1977-1983
 Baron de Strycker 1983-1987
 Burgrave Davignon 1988-2017
 François-Xavier de Donnea  2017-

Structure  
The Egmont Institute is governed by the Board of Directors. The current President is Knight François-Xavier de Donnéa, and Vice-President of the Egmont Institute is Peter Moors, Permanent Secretary of the Belgian Ministry of Foreign Affairs. Other members of the Board of Directors include prominent Belgian politicians, honorary ambassadors, public officials and academics. The current director general is Pol De Witte.

Mission 
The Royal Institute for International Relations is an independent think-tank based in Brussels. Its interdisciplinary research is conducted in a spirit of total academic freedom. Drawing on the expertise of its own research fellows, as well as that of external specialists, both Belgian and foreign, it provides analysis and policy options that are meant to be as operational as possible.

Research 
Policy research is a core activity of the Egmont institute. The research takes place within the framework of three research programmes:  European Affairs (dealing with European integration), Europe in the world (dealing with Europe’s role in international relations) and Africa (focusing mostly on Sub-Saharan and Central Africa).

European Affairs 
Situated in Brussels at the heart of EU political decision-making and under the direction of Jean-Louis de Brouwer, former Director at the European Commission, the European Affairs Programme aims to provide in-depth as well as policy-oriented analyses on a wide range of topics of relevance to EU policy-makers. Special attention is devoted to those matters that are – or ought to be – at the heart of the EU policy debate. Aside from a continuous focus on institutional matters, various substantive EU policies dominate the research agenda, such as the single market, energy and climate, and the EU budget. The Programme also deals extensively with the evolution of the Economic and Monetary Union in the context of the economic and financial crisis. Intent on reaching the broadest audience possible, the European Affairs Programme seeks to share its expertise and stimulate the debate on the European project through a variety of publications as well by organizing roundtables, expert-seminars and conferences.

Europe in the World 
Under the direction of Prof. Sven Biscop, the Europe in the World Programme starts from the firm assumption that the development of the European Union as an autonomous international actor in all areas of external action is a positive evolution. It offers the best chances for effective European policies to safeguard and enhance universal values and the national interests of EU Member States in an increasingly multipolar world. At the same time, the programme aims to critically and scientifically examine EU objectives, instruments and means, in order to assess their effectiveness, identify the weaknesses, and offer some recommendations for the way ahead, so as to improve the “strategic actorness” of the Union. Our research focuses on European strategy and strategic culture; European and transatlantic military and civilian institutions, capabilities, and industries; the EU’s strategic partnerships with great and emerging powers; as well as political and security developments in key geographic areas (Europe’s southern neighbourhood and the Asia-Pacific region). The programme also covers various aspects of Belgian diplomacy, and in the past has undertaken extensive research on terrorism.

Africa 
Under the direction of Prof. Nina Wilén, the main objective of the Africa Programme is to conduct research on political, economic, social and security issues and developments relating to Central and Eastern Africa. This research also relates to the major trends on the African continent (African Union, Regional Integration, conflict analysis and post-conflict reconstruction, state building and peace building) and it analyses the role and position of the EU in Sub-Saharan Africa. Through its own research and publications, a wide range of contacts, partnerships and activities with national and international research institutes, public authorities and NGOs, the programme contributes to the Belgian and international policy debate on Africa. The main tool for that policy debate is the ‘Observatoire de l’Afrique’ a network of European and African institutes and experts on peace and security issues in Africa. The ambition of the ‘Observatoire de l’Afrique’ is to promote open and constructive dialogue and debate, and to provide useful analysis to a wide range of policy makers.

Training 
The Egmont Education & Training Programme organises training courses for foreign diplomats and high executives at the request of public administrations from Belgium and third countries, including the Belgian Ministry of Foreign Affairs. Such courses are tailor-made with presentations, training sessions and simulation exercises conducted by experts and high-level diplomats, adapted to the recipient countries.

It also has developed extensive expertise in the field of public administration through support to the initial and continuous training of foreign public servants. This expertise started to develop with a first partnership with the National School for Public Administration of the Democratic Republic of Congo, ENA RDC. This partnership has run for 5 years and increased over time. New partnerships are being developed in priority countries of the Belgian development cooperation.

The success of the existing projects and prospects for future partnerships led to the conclusion of a Framework Agreement for Cooperation in the sector of Governance and Public Administration between the Egmont Institute and the Belgian Development Cooperation Agency, Enabel.

The Egmont Institute is an active partner of the Belgian Ministry for Foreign Affairs, the Belgian Federal Police and the Belgian Ministry of Justice in the field of civilian crisis management. Since 2009, we have been responsible for the organisation of the Belgian core course for experts to be deployed in missions, the Belgian Generic Training (BGT). This core course is a unique initiative to promote an integrated and shared learning for experts from different professional backgrounds (civil servants, police officers and external experts) who aim at being deployed in missions by Belgium. This training course therefore constitutes a prerequisite for the secondment in mission by Belgium.

Events 
The Egmont Institute organizes various events, mostly in Brussels. According to the Institute, its events aim to foster dialogue between researchers, policy-makers and civil society.  The Egmont Institute furthermore serves as a forum for visiting heads of state or government, representatives of international organizations and foreign ministers.

Partnerships 
The Egmont Institute takes part in numerous projects and networks, in collaboration with other research centers. It is a lead partner in the European Strategic Partnerships Observatory and l’Observatoire de l'Afrique.

The Egmont Institute is also a member of the European Security and Defence College (ESDC), the Euro-Mediterranean Study Commission (EuroMeSCo), the European Policy Institutes Network (EPIN), Think Global – Act European (TGAE), the Brussels Think Tank Dialogue (BTTD), Trans European Policy Studies Association (TEPSA), Europe-Africa Policy Research Network (EARN), and Expertise for Central Africa (E-CA). The institute regularly collaborates with the Belgian Royal High Institute for Defence.

In 2012, the Egmont Institute and the European Defence Agency launched the PhD Prize in European Defence, Security and Strategy.

Publications 
EGMONT publishes the Egmont Papers and Policy Briefs.

References

External links 

1947 establishments in Belgium
Think tanks established in 1947
Political and economic think tanks based in Europe
Foreign policy and strategy think tanks
Think tanks based in Belgium